Khambatki Ghat is a mountain pass on Pune-Kolhapur section of National Highway 48 in Maharashtra, India. This ghat lies in the Sahyadri mountain ranges (Western Ghats) and has picturesque mountain-scapes and a pleasant climate.

Details
Earlier, Khabataki ghat road was two-way. A separate tunnel was built later which separated the Kolhapur-Pune road. The current one-way tunnel was constructed through a mountain range as an alternative to existing Khambatki ghat in Khandala tehsil of Satara district. The new road has been set up for the vehicles coming from Satara to Pune. This ghat is en route Bengaluru from Pune. People going to Panchgani and Mahabaleshwar via Pune also use this ghat. Mahabaleshwar and Panchgani are two major tourist locations followed by the Sajjangad and Kas plateau, where thousands of tourists visit every year.

References

Mountain passes of Maharashtra
Mountain passes of the Western Ghats
Satara district